Walter Ciofani (born 17 February 1962 in Sedan, Ardennes) is a retired French hammer thrower. His personal best throw is 78.50 metres, achieved in May 1985 in Bourg-en-Bresse.

Achievements

External links

1962 births
Living people
French male hammer throwers
Athletes (track and field) at the 1984 Summer Olympics
Olympic athletes of France
People from Sedan, Ardennes
Sportspeople from Ardennes (department)